Soprano Sax is an album by saxophonist Zoot Sims recorded in 1976 and released by the Pablo label.

Reception

AllMusic reviewer Scott Yanow stated "Zoot Sims, known throughout his career as a hard-swinging tenor-saxophonist, started doubling successfully on soprano in 1973 and managed to become one of the best by simply playing in his own musical personality. This particular LP was his only full-length set on soprano but it is a rewarding one. ... A delightful set of swinging jazz, it's a surprise success".

Track listing
 "Someday Sweetheart" (John Spikes, Reb Spikes) – 6:00
 "Moonlight in Vermont" (Karl Suessdorf, John Blackburn) – 4:40
 "Wrap Your Troubles in Dreams (and Dream Your Troubles Away)" (Harry Barris, Ted Koehler) – 5:04
 "Blues for Louise" (Zoot Sims) – 6:58
 "Willow Weep for Me" (Ann Ronell) – 6:32
 "Wrap Up" (Sims) – 3:41
 "(I Don't Stand) A Ghost of a Chance with You" (Victor Young, Ned Washington, Bing Crosby) – 7:00
 "Baubles, Bangles and Beads" (Alexander Borodin, George Forrest, Robert Wright) – 4:43

Personnel 
Zoot Sims – soprano saxophone
Ray Bryant – piano
George Mraz – bass
Grady Tate – drums

References 

1976 albums
Zoot Sims albums
Pablo Records albums
Albums produced by Norman Granz